Parqash (local Quechua for two separate things which seem to be united (hispanicized spelling: Parcash) is a mountain in the Andes of Peru which reaches an altitude of approximately  . It is located in the Lima Region, Huaral Province, Atavillos Alto District.

References

Mountains of Peru
Mountains of Lima Region